Paul Robert Whitaker (born 28 June 1973 in Keighley) is a former English cricketer. Whitaker was a right-handed batsman who bowled right-arm Off-break.

Early life
Whitaker was educated at Grange Middle School and Whitcliffe Mount School in Yorkshire.

Cricket career
Whitaker joined Hampshire in 1994 and made his first-class debut that year against Leicestershire. In the 1995/96 New Zealand cricket season, Whitaker also represented Central Districts in six one-day matches in the Shell Cup. Whitaker was released by Hampshire at the end of the 1998 County Championship season. He also represented England at U 17, U 18 and U 19 level.

References

External links
Paul Whitaker on Cricinfo
Paul Whitaker on CricketArchive

1973 births
Living people
Cricketers from Keighley
English cricketers
Hampshire cricketers
Central Districts cricketers
English cricketers of 1969 to 2000